Jack Phillip Oliver is a former Republican member of the Ohio House of Representatives, representing the 3rd District from 1969 to 1972.

References

External links

Republican Party members of the Ohio House of Representatives
Living people
1931 births